The Miles Glacier Bridge, also known as the Million Dollar Bridge, was built in the early 1900s across the Copper River fifty miles from Cordova in what is now the U.S. state of Alaska. It is a multiple-span Pennsylvania truss bridge which completed a  railroad line for the Copper River and Northwestern Railway, built by J. P. Morgan and the Guggenheim family to haul copper from the old mining town of Kennicott, now located within the Wrangell–St. Elias National Park and Preserve, to the port of Cordova. It earned its nickname because of its $1.4 million cost, well recouped by the about $200 million worth of copper ore which was shipped as a result of its construction.

Current access to the bridge is limited to jet boat travel up the Copper River or boat travel downriver from Chitina due to the erosion along the Copper River Highway, and there is currently no access by road. The cost of repairs has prevented necessary maintenance albeit Miles Glacier bridge remains an attraction for tourists.

History 
The Copper River and Northwestern Railway and associated bridges were built between 1906 and 1911 by Michael James Heney. This bridge was the most significant of the group. However, its use as a railroad bridge ended in 1938 when the Copper River and Northwestern Railway shut down.

Work to convert the old rail bed into a highway bridge was completed in 1958. In the same year, a plaque was placed on the bridge:
This Bridge once served the Copper River and Northwestern Railroad trains, and was converted to a Highway Bridge in 1958.  The Bridge crosses the Copper River between two scenic and active glaciers.  The Childs Glacier to the west and the Miles Glacier to the east.  Known as the Million Dollar Bridge, and constructed during severe winter conditions.  It was considered one of the great engineering feats of all time.

The bridge was among many affected by the 1964 Alaska earthquake – while other bridges along the Copper River Highway from Cordova to Chitina were destroyed, the Million Dollar Bridge was "merely damaged".  One of the bridge spans, #4, slipped off its foundation after the earthquake.

The bridge was placed on the National Register of Historic Places in 2000.

Features
The bridge at Mile 49 needed to span 1,500 feet of the Copper River between two glaciers on either bank.  Ice calving from the Miles Glacier meant the bridge needed to withstand icebergs, up to 20 feet in height, moving with the 7.2 miles per hour current.  Additionally, the river ranged 24 feet in height.  The bed of the river was loose sand and gravel to a depth of 20 feet.

The site was selected in 1907 and the bridge would have four spans, #1 at 400 feet, #2 at 300 feet, #3 at 450 feet and #4 at 400 feet, mounted on three piers.  The piers would be placed on bars out of the way of most ice.  Piers #1 and #2 required detached icebreakers.  Excavation of the piers and icebreakers was accomplished through the use of caissons.  The track reached the bridge site in Oct. 1908.  Actual bridge construction started on 5 April 1909 with span #1 completed in 10.5 days, span #2 in 6 days, span #3 in 10 days and span #4 was completed a month later.  The bridge was in full service by July 1910.

Repairs
Temporary repairs, consisting of a rudimentary system of cables, I-beams, and planks, kept the bridge passable after the 1964 earthquake. The bridge was permanently repaired starting in 2004, and the repaired bridge was dedicated in August 2005. The controversial decision was made to repair it after a severe September 1995 flood caused the bridge to be impassable and also made an eventual washout of debris onto Childs Glacier inevitable. State engineers determined that it was less expensive to repair the bridge than it would be to remove it, or (in a worst-case scenario) clean up if the bridge completely collapsed into the river. Such a cleanup would have been required due to the Copper River salmon runs.  The repairs cost $16 million in federal and $3 million in state tax dollars.

In August 2016, a large iceberg struck the icebreaker protecting the bridge’s first pier. The damaged icebreaker was moved downstream during a high water event in 2019, and offers no protection to the first pier.

See also
List of bridges documented by the Historic American Engineering Record in Alaska
List of bridges on the National Register of Historic Places in Alaska
National Register of Historic Places listings in Chugach Census Area, Alaska

References

External links

1911 newspaper article about the Kenicott-Cordova line
1985 article from the Alaska Science Forum
2002 article from the Alaska Science Forum
A panoramic image of the bridge, probably taken in the 1920s

1911 establishments in Alaska
Bridges completed in 1911
Bridges in Unorganized Borough, Alaska
Bridges to nowhere
Buildings and structures on the National Register of Historic Places in Chugach Census Area, Alaska
Historic American Engineering Record in Alaska
Pennsylvania truss bridges in the United States
Railroad bridges on the National Register of Historic Places in Alaska
Road bridges on the National Register of Historic Places in Alaska
Steel bridges in the United States